Sékou Bagayoko (born 31 December 1987) is a Malian  professional football player who plays for Jeunesse Sportive de la Saoura.

Club career
Bagayoko started his senior career in the springtime 2007 with Djoliba AC in the Malian Première Division.
On juin 9, 2011, Sékou signed for Algerian club MC Saida. On October 1, 2011, he made his debut for the club as a starter in a league game against AS Khroub,. He signed in June 2011 for  MC Saïda of the Algerian Ligue Professionnelle 1.

References

1987 births
Algerian Ligue Professionnelle 1 players
Malian footballers
Expatriate footballers in Algeria
Expatriate footballers in Libya
Living people
MC Saïda players
Malian expatriate sportspeople in Algeria
JS Saoura players
Sportspeople from Bamako
Association football midfielders
Olympic Azzaweya SC players
21st-century Malian people